Don Jordan (June 22, 1934 – February 13, 1997) was an American boxer born in Los Angeles, California and was the Welterweight Champion of the World from 1958 to 1960. His nickname was ‘Geronimo’. He was of Mexican and African American descent.

Career
Born 22 June 1934 in Los Angeles, Jordan’s brief spell as an amateur shows that he began boxing as a Middleweight and – unusually – worked his way down to Welterweight as a professional. His amateur career spanned just fifteen contests, of which he lost only one.

Jordan fought professionally for the first time in April, 1953. Standing 5 feet 9 inches and typically weighing around 147 lbs, Jordan was well-proportioned and quickly showed himself to be an effective performer, winning nine in a row before dropping a decision in March 1954, to a fighter he had out-pointed just two months previously. He beat Art Ramponi to pick up the California State Welterweight title in October of that year and opened his 1955 campaign with a victory over former World Lightweight Champion Lauro Salas. From that point on, Jordan would be mixing it with the best.

Jordan’s progress over the next three years – including two notable victories over Gaspar Ortega – were rewarded when he challenged Virgil Akins for the World Welterweight Championship on 5 December 1958, winning by unanimous decision. Akins – who disputed the decision – would suffer an identical reverse when he met Jordan in a championship return five months later. That was the first of Jordan’s two successful title defences (the second was against Denny Moyer on 10 July 1959), before losing the title to Benny Paret, eighteen months after being crowned.

Once he lost his title, Jordan also seemed to lose his way. The last years of his career saw him record more defeats than victories and he was effectively – if ignominiously – ‘retired’ by the man refereeing his October 1962 contest with Battling Torres. When Jordan refused to get up after a knockdown in the first, referee Jimmy Wilson ruled that Torres had not actually hit Jordan hard enough to put him down and the fight was declared a ‘no contest’. Subsequently, the California State Athletic Commission suspended Jordan indefinitely. In 1961 Lucchese crime family mobster Frankie Carbo, known as "the Czar of Boxing" was charged with extortion and conspiracy regarding Jordan, convicted and given a 25-year federal sentence. Others convicted were Louis Tom Dragna (conviction overturned), Truman Gibson, Joe Sica, and Frank "Blinky" Palermo.

Death
After being robbed and seriously assaulted in a Los Angeles parking lot in September 1996, Don Jordan went into a coma, and died in a nursing home in San Pedro, California, on 13 February 1997.

Professional boxing record

See also
List of welterweight boxing champions

References

Sources
1. Biographical information: (i) The Ring Record Book & Boxing Encyclopedia 1959 (Nat Fleischer, The Ring Book Shop Inc., 1959). See p. 8 for a very brief cameo. (ii) WBA Online , offers confirmation of the date and manner of Jordan’s death.

2. Ring Record: (i) The Cyber Boxing Zone . This source misses Jordan’s first defence of the Welterweight Championship, taking place 24 April 1959. (ii) The Boxing Records Archive . This source also provides information about the manner of the end of Jordan's career. (iii) The Ring Record Book & Boxing Encyclopedia 1959 (Nat Fleischer, The Ring Book Shop Inc., 1959), P.276.

External links
 
https://boxrec.com/media/index.php/National_Boxing_Association%27s_Quarterly_Ratings:_1958
https://boxrec.com/media/index.php/National_Boxing_Association%27s_Quarterly_Ratings:_1959
https://boxrec.com/media/index.php/National_Boxing_Association%27s_Quarterly_Ratings:_1960
  http://www.thecruelestsport.blogspot.com/2009/04/catastrophist-troubled-world-of-don.html

1934 births
1997 deaths
1996 murders in the United States
Boxers from Los Angeles
Male murder victims
People murdered in California
Deaths by beating in the United States
American male boxers
American boxers of Mexican descent
Welterweight boxers